This is a list of the units, aircraft and casualties of the  British air services in the Falklands War. The numbers in bold are the number of aircraft used in the war, the numbers in brackets are the number of lost aircraft. For a list of air forces from Argentina, see Argentine air forces in the Falklands War.

Units

Army Air Corps

 No. 656 Squadron Army Air Corps – (Gazelle AH.1, Scout AH.1) 6 (1), 6

Royal Marines

 3 CDO Brigade Air Squadron – (Gazelle AH.1, Scout AH.1) 9 (2), 6 (1)

Fleet Air Arm
[[File:Lynx 335 HMS Cardiff March 1982.jpg|thumb|[[HMS Cardiff (D108)|HMS ''Cardiffs]] Lynx helicopter 1982.]]

Royal Air Force
All of the four-engined aircraft operated from Wideawake Airfield, Ascension Island, but flew in the war zone.

 No. 1(F) Squadron – (Harrier GR.3) 10 (4) ( & Port San Carlos)
 No. 18 Squadron – (Chinook HC.1) 4 (3) +1 at Wideawake
 No. 29 Squadron – (Phantom FGR.2) 3; only at Wideawake
 No. 39 Squadron – (Canberra PR.9) 2; Clandestine operations from Chile
 No. 42 Squadron – (Nimrod MR.2) 3 No. 44 Squadron – (Vulcan B.2) 2 No. 47 Squadron – (Hercules C.1) 3 No. 50 Squadron – (Vulcan B.2) 1 No. 51 Squadron – (Nimrod R.1) 3 No. 55 Squadron – (Victor K.2) 10 No. 57 Squadron – (Victor K.2) 10 No. 70 Squadron – (Hercules C.1) 3 No. 101 Squadron – (Vulcan B.2) 1 No. 120 Squadron – (Nimrod MR.2) 3 No. 201 Squadron – (Nimrod MR.2) 3 No. 202 Squadron – (Sea King HAR.3) 1  only at Wideawake
 No. 206 Squadron – (Nimrod MR.2) 4 No. 10 Squadron - (VC10 C.1) 14Armament

 L44A1 GPMG (General Purpose Machine Gun)
 30 mm ADEN Cannon with 120–130 rounds Sea Harrier, Harrier GR.3
 AIM-9D/G Sidewinder Air-to-air missile (AAM) F-4 at Wideawake
 AIM-9L Sidewinder AAM Sea Harrier, Harrier GR.3
 AGM-45 Shrike Air-to-Surface Anti-radiation missile (ARM) Vulcan
 BAe Sea Skua Air-to-Surface anti-ship missile Lynx
 Aerospatiale AS.12 Air-to-Surface missile Wasp
 Paveway II Laser-guided bomb (LGB), 454 kg Harrier GR.3
 BL755 Cluster bomb with 147 bomblets  Sea Harrier & Nimrod
 1,000 lb General-Purpose Bomb Sea Harrier, Harrier GR.3, Vulcan & Nimrod
 SNEB Rockets Harrier GR.3, Gazelle
Marconi Stingray Torpedo 
Mk. 46 Torpedo
 Mk. 11 Depth charge

Air campaign

Casualties and aircraft losses

 Human losses:
 2 Army Air Corps
 4 3 Commando Brigade Air Squadron Royal Marines
 17 Fleet Air Arm
 Passengers 1 Royal Air Force
 18 Special Air Service (Army)
 3 Royal Corps of Signals (Army)
 Aircraft Lost in the Air:, no suffix: Fleet Air Arm
 2 Sea Harrier FRS.1 (hit by anti-aircraft fire during 4 May attack on Goose Green and by Roland missile during 1 June attack on Port Stanley)
 3 Westland Gazelle AH.1 Army and Royal Marines  (2 Gazelles shot down by Argentine army forces small arms leaving San Carlos area on 21 May)
 3 Harrier GR.3 RAF (shot down by shoulder-fired missile in Port Howard on 21 May, hit by anti-aircraft fire on 27 May over Goose Green and hit by ground fire near Port Stanley on 30 May)
 1 Scout AH.1 Royal Marines (shot down by Pucara at Goose Green on 28 May)
 Flying accidents in the war zone 2 Westland Wessex HU.5 (crashed in bad weather on Fortune Glacier 22 April)
 2 Westland Sea King HC.4 (1 lost operational accident 23 April)
 4 Sea Harrier FRS.1 (two 801 Sqn CAP collided over the task force on 6 May – one 800 Sqn crashed during takeoff from Hermes on 24 May – one 801 Sqn slid off deck in bad weather on 29 May)
 2 Westland Sea King HAS.5 (ditched on 12 May & 17 May)
 1 Harrier GR.3 RAF (landing accident on 8 June)
 1 Scout AH.1 Royal Marines (crash landed after main rotor gearbox failure over MacPhee Pond, 8 June. Recovered but written off.)
 Lost on board a ship 3 Westland Lynx HAS.2 (aboard Ardent on 21 May and aboard Coventry and Atlantic Conveyor on 25 May)
 3 Chinook HC.1 RAF
 6 Westland Wessex HU.5
 1 Westland Wessex HAS.3 (when Glamorgan hit by shore-launched Exocet on 12 June)
 Self-destruct in Chile 1 Westland Sea King HC.4 (on 20 May)Total'''
10 fixed-wing aircraft and 25 helicopters.

See also

 British ground forces in the Falklands War
 British naval forces in the Falklands War

References

External links
 British site about British Aircraft lost
 Britains Small Wars.com:
 Argentine Air Force (FAA) official site about the Malvinas/Falkland Air War
 Fleet Air Arm – RAF Role and Operations

Aerial operations and battles of the Falklands War
British military aviation
Falklands War orders of battle